The communauté de communes de la Septaine is located in the Cher  département  of the Centre-Val de Loire region of France. It was established on 15 December 1999. Its seat is Avord. Its area is 391.5 km2, and its population was 10,774 in 2018.

Composition
The communauté de communes consists of the following 15 communes:

Avord
Baugy
Chaumoux-Marcilly
Crosses
Étréchy
Farges-en-Septaine
Gron
Jussy-Champagne
Nohant-en-Goût
Osmoy
Savigny-en-Septaine
Soye-en-Septaine
Villabon
Villequiers
Vornay

References

Septaine
Septaine